The Central District of Mehriz County is in Yazd province, Iran. At the National Census in 2006, its population was 43,363 in 11,855 households. The following census in 2011 counted 44,126 people in 13,073 households. At the latest census in 2016, the district had 51,733 inhabitants in 15,978 households.

References 

Mehriz County

Districts of Yazd Province

Populated places in Yazd Province

Populated places in Mehriz County